The 2000-01 Taiwan season was the first season for the Taiwan national baseball team in the International Baseball League of Australia's Development League, The team played in the one and only season. All games were held on the Gold Coast at Palm Meadows with some showcase games played at Carrara Oval.

The teams roster was a mix of professional and amateur players from the countries various Leagues, The team was the national team selected for the 2001 Asian Baseball Championship.

Regular season 
The regular season consisted of 42 games, All games were played at Palm Meadows with the exception of showcase games that were played at Carrara Oval.

Standings

Record vs opponents

Game log 

|- bgcolor=#bbffbb
| 1
| 29 October 2000 (Carrara Oval)
| Australia
| 5-2
|
|
|
|
| 1-0
|
|- bgcolor=#bbffbb
| 2
| 30 October 2000 (Carrara Oval)
| @ Australia
| 5-4
|
|
|
|
| 2-0
|

|- bgcolor=#ffbbbb
| 3
| 1 December 2000 (Carrara Oval)
| Australia
| 4-12
|
|
|
|
| 2-1
|
|- bgcolor=#ffbbbb
| 4
| 2 December 2000
| @ Australia
| 3-2
|
|
|
|
| 2-2
|
|- bgcolor=#bbffbb
| 5
| 4 December 2000 (Carrara Oval)
| MLB Stars
| 2-2
|
|
|
|
| 3-2
|
|- bgcolor=#ffbbbb
| 6
| 5 December 2000 (Carrara Oval)
| @ MLB Stars
| 2-4
|
|
|
|
| 3-3
|
|- bgcolor=#ffbbbb
| 7
| 6 December 2000 (Carrara Oval)
| MLB Stars
| 2-8
|
|
|
|
| 3-4
|
|- bgcolor=#bbffbb
| 8
| 7 December 2000 (Carrara Oval)
| Internationals
| 1-0
|
|
|
|
| 4-4
|
|- bgcolor=#ffbbbb
| 9
| 8 December 2000 (Carrara Oval)
| @ Internationals
| 0-3
|
|
|
|
| 4-5
|
|- bgcolor=#bbffbb
| 10
| 9 December 2000
| Internationals
| 10-5
|
|
|
|
| 5-5
|
|- bgcolor=#ffbbbb
| 11
| 11 December 2000 (Carrara Oval)
| @ Australia
| 1-5
|
|
|
|
| 5-6
|
|- bgcolor=#ffbbbb
| 12
| 12 December 2000 (Carrara Oval)
| Australia
| 3-5
|
|
|
|
| 5-7
|
|- bgcolor=#ffbbbb
| 13
| 13 December 2000 (Carrara Oval)
| @ Australia
| 0-1
|
|
|
|
| 5-8
|
|- bgcolor=#bbffbb
| 14
| 14 December 2000 (Carrara Oval)
| MLB Stars
| 4-3
|
|
|
|
| 6-8
|
|- bgcolor=#bbffbb
| 15
| 16 December 2000
| MLB Stars
| 3-2
|
|
|
|
| 7-8
|
|- bgcolor=#bbffbb
| 16
| 18 December 2000 (Carrara Oval)
| @ Internationals
| 7-1
|
|
|
|
| 8-8
|
|- bgcolor=#bbbbff
| 17
| 19 December 2000 (Carrara Oval)
| @ Internationals
| 2-2
|
|
|
|
| 8-8
|
|- bgcolor=#ffbbbb
| 18
| 20 December 2000 (Carrara Oval)
| Internationals
| 2-4
|
|
|
|
| 8-9
|
|- bgcolor=#bbffbb
| 19
| 21 December 2000
| @ Australia
| 7-4
|
|
|
|
| 9-9
|
|- bgcolor=#bbffbb
| 20
| 22 December 2000
| Australia
| 13-8
|
|
|
|
| 10-9
|
|- bgcolor=#bbbbff
| 21
| 23 December 2000
| @ Australia
| 5-5
|
|
|
|
| 10-9
|
|- bgcolor=#bbffbb
| 22
| 27 December 2000
| Internationals
| 5-3
|
|
|
|
| 11-9
|
|- bgcolor=#ffbbbb
| 23
| 27 December 2000
| MLB Stars
| 4-16
|
|
|
|
| 10-10
|
|- bgcolor=#bbffbb
| 24
| 30 December 2000
| @ Internationals
| 2-0
|
|
|
|
| 11-10
|
|- bgcolor=#ffbbbb
| 25
| 31 December 2000
| @ MLB Stars
| 0-3
|
|
|
|
| 11-11
|

|- bgcolor=#bbffbb
| 26
| 2 January 2000 (Carrara Oval)
| @ Australia
| 3-2
|
|
|
|
| 12-11
|
|- bgcolor=#bbffbb
| 27
| 3 January 2001 (Carrara Oval)
| Australia
| 7-6
|
|
|
|
| 13-11
|
|- bgcolor=#bbbbff
| 28
| 4 January 2001
| @ Internationals
| 3-3
|
|
|
|
| 13-11
|
|- bgcolor=#ffbbbb
| 29
| 5 January 2001
| Internationals
| 5-12
|
|
|
|
| 13-12
|
|- bgcolor=#ffbbbb
| 30
| 6 January 2001
| @ Internationals
| 2-6
|
|
|
|
| 13-13
|
|- bgcolor=#bbbbff
| 31
| 8 January 2001 (Carrara Oval)
| @ Australia
| 2-2
|
|
|
|
| 13-13
|
|- bgcolor=#ffbbbb
| 32
| 9 January 2001 (Carrara Oval)
| Australia
| 1-12
|
|
|
|
| 13-14
|
|- bgcolor=#bbffbb
| 33
| 10 January 2001 (Carrara Oval)
| @ Australia
| 4-2
|
|
|
|
| 14-14
|
|- bgcolor=#bbffbb
| 34
| 11 January 2001 (Carrara Oval)
| MLB Stars
| 6-4
|
|
|
|
| 15-14
|
|- bgcolor=#ffbbbb
| 35
| 12 January 2001 (Carrara Oval)
| @ MLB Stars
| 0-2
|
|
|
|
| 15-15
|
|- bgcolor=#bbffbb
| 36
| 13 January 2001
| @ MLB Stars
| 4-2
|
|
|
|
| 16-15
|
|- bgcolor=#bbffbb
| 37
| 15 January 2001 (Carrara Oval)
| Internationals
| 7-0
|
|
|
|
| 17-15
|
|- bgcolor=#bbffbb
| 38
| 16 January 2001
| Australia
| 7-6
|
|
|
|
| 18-15
|
|- bgcolor=#ffbbbb
| 39
| 17 January 2001
| @ Internationals
| 1-7
|
|
|
|
| 18-16
|
|- bgcolor=#ffbbbb
| 40
| 18 January 2001
| MLB Stars
| 2-7
|
|
|
|
| 18-17
|
|- bgcolor=#ffbbbb
| 41
| 19 January 2001
| Australia
| 1-3
|
|
|
|
| 18-18
|
|- bgcolor=#ffbbbb
| 42
| 20 January 2001
| MLB Stars
| 0-6
|
|
|
|
| 18-19
|

Postseason
All games for the 2001 postseason were played at Palm Meadows on the Gold Coast. All finals were a 1-game play-off.

Finals Series
Winners of Game 1 and 2 went into Championship games, Losers of game 1 and 2 went into a playoff for 3rd.

Game 2 2nd vs 3rd: 19 January 2001

Game 3 Loser 1 vs Loser 2: 20 January 2001

Awards

Roster

References 

IBLA Internationals